Stephen P. Laurie is a British amateur astronomer. He is a prolific discoverer of asteroids and comets, although his profession is that of an actuary. He has also worked on searches for dwarf stars and discovered a supernova (SN 1997bq in NGC 3147) in 1997.

Laurie has named five asteroids he discovered from the Church Stretton area — 7603 Salopia (named after Shropshire), 9421 Violilla, 9428 Angelalouise, 10216 Popastro and 11626 Church Stretton — all discovered at observatory 966 Church Stretton and nearby location Ragdon (observatory J17). Laurie lives and works in the Church Stretton area.

References

20th-century British astronomers
Discoverers of asteroids
Living people
People from Church Stretton
Year of birth missing (living people)